The Oxford History of Historical Writing is a five volume multi-authored history of historical writing published by Oxford University Press under the general editorship of Daniel Woolf.

Volumes
 Volume 1: Beginnings to AD 600. Edited by Andrew Feldherr & Grant Hardy. (2011)
 Volume 2: 600–1400. Edited by Sarah Foot & Chase F. Robinson. (2012)
 Volume 3: 1400–1800. Edited by José Rabasa, Masayuki Sato, Edoardo Tortarolo, & Daniel Woolf. (2012)
 Volume 4: 1800–1945. Edited by Stuart Macintyre, Juan Maiguashca, & Attila Pók. (2011)
 Volume 5: Historical Writing since 1945. Edited by Axel Schneider & Daniel Woolf. (2011)

References 

Oxford University Press books
2011 non-fiction books
Books about historiography
Historiography